The IIHF Development Cup is an international ice hockey tournament. It has been established to provide a showcase tournament for non-competing International Ice Hockey Federation (IIHF) countries. The first edition was held in Canillo from 29 September to 1 October 2017 with Morocco winning this title.

Results
{| class="wikitable sortable plainrowheaders"
|-
! scope="col" | Year
! scope="col" style="background:#F7F6A8" |  Gold
! scope="col" style="background:#DCE5E5" |  Silver
! scope="col" style="background:#FFDAB9" |  Bronze
! scope="col" | 4th place
! scope="col" | Host city
! scope="col" | Host country
|-
! scope="row" | 2017
|  
|  
|  
|  
| Canillo
| 
|-
! scope="row" | 2018
|  
|  
|  
|  
| Füssen
| 
|-
! scope="row" | 2019
| align=center colspan="6" rowspan="2" | Tournament cancelled due to the COVID-19 pandemic
|-
| 2020
|-
! scope="row" | 2022
|  
|  
|  
|  
| Füssen
| 
|}

Medal table

References

External links
Development Cup - official facebookDevelopment Cup - eurohockey.com''

International Ice Hockey Federation tournaments
Recurring sporting events established in 2017